Thayeria boehlkei is a species of characin fish endemic to the Amazon river basin and Araguaia river, in Peru and Brazil respectively. The species is popular with aquarium hobbyists where it is traded under a variety of common names including blackline penguinfish, blackline thayeria, hockey-stick tetra, penguin fish and penguin tetra.

The fish is named in honor of James E. Böhlke (1930-1982) of the Academy of Natural Sciences of Philadelphia, because of his interest in and contributions to the knowledge of South American characids.

Location and habitat
Thayeria inhabits small streams and the margins of smaller rivers in the lowland Amazon basin, where it is part of the highly diverse Neotropical fish fauna.

Misidentification
The species was previously misidentified as Thayeria sanctaemariae and Thayeria obliqua. T. obliqua is a superficially similar, but different species of Thayeria, while T. sanctaemariae, is a synonym of T. obliqua.

Diet
The species feeds on worms, small insects, flake food and crustaceans.

Reproduction
In captivity, this normally schooling species forms pairs that scatter their many adhesive eggs amongst plants. Clutch size is very large and may be up to 1000 eggs,  the embryos of which are black in colour The eggs hatch in about 20 hours and are free-swimming after 4 days.

In the aquarium
The species is best kept in groups, to allow the species to school, in tropical freshwater community aquaria with other peaceful, non-predatory fishes. This fish tolerates a fairly broad range of water pHs, but prefers acidic water for breeding.

See also
Tetra
List of freshwater aquarium fish species

References

External links 
Penguin Tetra Fact Sheet
Badmans Tropical Fish
Mongabay

Tetras
Characidae
Fish of South America
Taxa named by Stanley Howard Weitzman
Fish described in 1957